The 2006 FIFA World Cup qualification AFC play-off was the first round of the Asian Football Confederation qualification for the 2006 FIFA World Cup. The 14 teams with the lowest FIFA rankings played home-and-away knockout matches to qualify for the second stage.

Summary

|}

Matches

Turkmenistan won 13–0 on aggregate and advanced to the second round.

Chinese Taipei won 6–1 on aggregate and advanced to the second round.

Tajikistan won 4–0 on aggregate and advanced to the second round.

Sri Lanka won 3–0 on aggregate and advanced to the second round.

Kyrgyzstan won 6–0 on aggregate and advanced to the second round.

Maldives won 13–0 on aggregate and advanced to the second round.

Ranking of losing teams

Both Guam and Nepal would have played against each other to decide who progresses to the next round. After Nepal withdrew first, Guam would have progressed but Guam withdrew later as well. So, FIFA decided to elect a "lucky loser", to find the best of the teams that lost, who would also advance to the second round. 

The losers were compared, using the following criteria to break ties: 
a) number of points 
b) goal difference 
c) goals scored 

Thus, Laos advanced to the second round.

See also
2006 FIFA World Cup qualification – AFC second round

References

1
2003 in Asian football
2003 in Turkmenistani football
2003 in Afghan sport
2003 in Taiwanese football
2003 in Macau football
2003 in Bangladeshi football
2003 in Tajikistani football
2003–04 in Pakistani football
2003 in Laotian football
2003 in Sri Lankan sport
2003 in Kyrgyzstani football
2003 in Maldivian football
2003 in Mongolian sport

es:Clasificación de AFC para la Copa Mundial de Fútbol de 2006#Primera ronda
nl:Wereldkampioenschap voetbal 2006 (kwalificatie AFC)#voorronde